The following list is a chart of the most expensive coins.  Most of these are auction prices.  Several private sale prices over $2m are not in this list yet.

References 

 coins.ha.com. Retrieved on 2020-06-21.
 Yeoman, R.S. A Guide Book of United States Coins Atlanta: Whitman Publishing, 2009 ixlmath.com

Numismatics
Lists of coins
Coins
Auction-related lists